Gide River (Swedish: Gideälven) is a river in Sweden.

References

Rivers of Västernorrland County
Drainage basins of the Baltic Sea